Rangiora AFC was a football club in Rangiora, New Zealand. In 2009, Rangiora AFC and Kaiapoi FC merged to form Waimak United FC.

References

External links
New Zealand 2004/05 Season Results

Association football clubs in New Zealand
Sport in Canterbury, New Zealand
2009 disestablishments in New Zealand
Rangiora